is a PlayStation Portable role-playing video game for the series. Other ones include Shining Tears and Shining Wind. It was adapted into an anime miniseries Shining Hearts: Shiawase no Pan.

Gameplay 
The player controls four characters for the team. The ocean serves as a major part with the ship, and serves as a home. While it starts off in a ragged state, the player can build up with new functions to travel through islands. The player can roam the island, take part in many activities, and progress through story missions or take on side quests. The player collects materials for baking, forging and fishing. The player can work through the story and help villagers for quests to collect Hearts. These can be given to Kaguya to help her return her emotions. After restoring her emotions, Kaguya's spirit stone releases "Heart Keys", which can open doors to new worlds for new stories. Hearts have a parameter indicating how people feel about the characters. In response to their actions, they release any type of colours with feelings. By collecting them, the player can bring about changes to the setting and world, and expand the journey to new areas. Hearts can be used in battle. It is possible to use Hearts when preparing bread at the bakery. One method for collecting Hearts is through the Mind Over Emotion System. During conversation, the player can select a response under constraint of time. Depending on the selection, the conversation partner can release Hearts indicating their reaction. Their favor for characters can change accordingly. There is more than one in the game, and one of them being the "Battle MOE" System. Battle MOE is a group attack system. The player receives a chance to pair up with one of them for groups. Depending on the selections, the player can get different moves. Some group attacks result in heal spells and in group attacks among others. Emotional characters can change during combat. They can perform team attacks for the player to release Red Hearts. Any unselected characters will release Blue Hearts.

Plot

Story 
Kaguya, an amnesic girl washed ashore, meets a swordsman Rick. The peaceful island of Wyndaria is invaded by pirates who seek the pendant. Knowing the situation, Rick plans to restore her memory.

Characters 
: A male swordsman who is drifted to the island of Wyndaria. He works with a trio of sisters at the bakery.
: A mysterious girl who was washed ashore the island of Wyndaria after the storm. She suffers amnesia and along with them, her emotions. Soon after meeting Rick, the pirates seek the amulet necklace Kaguya is wearing.
: Princess of Wynderia. She is kind and gentle, and due to her interest in tea and herbs, she appears in the palace garden. She takes a great interest in Rick and his party.
: Prince of Wynderia, and Rufina's elder brother. He can often be seen dealing with herbs in the palace garden. He serves as a guide for Rick.
: Rufina's maid. She belongs to the beast race. She is an expert with blades, and keeps a good store underneath her dress and in a bag.
: A fickle black cat pirate and a member of the beast race. She runs an antique shop. Her nickname is "Black Tail".
: One of the forest elves with the ability to control spirits. After hearing the warning of an approaching change in the world, he meets Rick. In battle, he uses a bow and magic. He is meant to support from the back line with pride.
: A ice witch living in a mansion near the village. because she is not fond of people and likes the night, she stays inside. Rick ends up in the company of Melty as he searches for the ingredients for creating "extreme ice cream." In battle, all Melty's special attacks are ice cream based. She uses her partner, Sorbet, to absorb her damage.
: Melty's familiar spirit.
: The pirate captain of a group, Arc Buccaneers.
: A female pirate.

 Kaguya's robot partner.

Development and release 
The music of the game is composed by Hiroki Kikuta. The game was released on December 16, 2010, in Japan. The song, entitled , sung by Lia, was released on December 15, 2010. The soundtrack was released on January 26, 2011.

Reception

Anime adaptation

References

External links 
  

Shining (series)
Japan-exclusive video games
PlayStation Portable-only games
Role-playing video games
Sega video games
Video games featuring female protagonists
Video games scored by Hiroki Kikuta
2010 video games
PlayStation Portable games
Video games developed in Japan